Andreucci is an Italian surname, derived from Andrea (Andrew). Notable people with the surname include:

Chris Andreucci (born 1998), Scottish country music singer/songwriter
Florinda Andreucci (born 1969), former Italian female long-distance runner
Lucilla Andreucci (born 1969), Italian former female long-distance runner
Martius Andreucci (died 1623), Roman Catholic prelate who served as Bishop of Trogir
Paolo Andreucci (born 1965), Italian rally driver

Italian-language surnames
Patronymic surnames
Surnames from given names